The Kamorta-class corvettes or Project 28 are a class of anti-submarine warfare stealth corvettes currently in service with the Indian Navy. Built at Garden Reach Shipbuilders & Engineers (GRSE), Kolkata, they are the first anti-submarine warfare stealth corvettes to be built in India. Project 28 was approved in 2003, with construction of the lead ship,  commencing on 12 August 2005.

The platform and major internal systems of this class of corvettes are indigenously designed and built. The corvettes are named after the islands in the Lakshadweep archipelago.

Design and description
In 2003, under the code name Project 28, the Indian Navy placed an order for four anti-submarine warfare (ASW) corvettes. The corvette's design was originally planned to be based on the Russian corvette Project 2038.2, however the basic design was later provided by the Indian Navy's Directorate of Naval Design, followed by the detailed design by Garden Reach Ship Builders and Engineers (GRSE). The design includes many stealth ship features, including reductions in acoustic signature and vibration of the vessels.

The class incorporates some major features including but not limited to the 'X'-shaped hull form to improve stealth, a raft-mounted propulsion system to reduce vibration, and an infrared signature suppression system. It also includes networks such as the Total Atmospheric Control System (TACS), Integrated Platform Management System (IPMS), Integrated Bridge System (IBS), Battle Damage Control System (BDCS) and Personnel Locator System (PLS). The ships also include technology that enables them to fight in nuclear, biological and chemical warfare (NBC) scenarios. The Indian Navy claims that the indigenisation achieved in these ships is about 90%.

General characteristics and propulsion
Each ship retains a complement of 180 sailors and 13 officers.

Electronics and sensors
The Kamorta-class corvettes boast a wide variety of sensors. Given below are the list of known sensors in the corvette:
 BEL Revathi 3-D E/F-band radar
 HUMSA-NG bow-mounted sonar
 BEL Lynx U1 fire-control radar
 IAC Mod C fire-control system
 1 × Atlas Elektronik towed array sonar (to be fitted)

Armament 
The fire-control system is the Bharat Electronics IAC Mod C system.

There is an option on the ship to include surface-to-air missiles (SAM). As of 2022 Navy is planning to integrated VL-SRSAM. The corvette can hold one helicopter, which currently is a Westland Sea King Mk.42B helicopter.

Construction
The order for four Kamorta-class corvettes were placed in 2003 by the Indian Navy. Construction of the lead ship, INS Kamorta began in the year 2005 and the keel was laid down in 2006 at GRSE, Kolkata. The ship was launched in the year 2010 and was inducted into the navy in 2014 after a series of delays. Construction of the second ship,  followed and the keel was laid in 2007. The corvette was launched in 2011 and was inducted in the early 2016.  was laid down in 2010 and launched in 2013. While the last ship of its class,  was laid down in 2012 and launched in 2015. Both the ships were commissioned in 2017 and 2020 respectively.

The project's objective was to enhance localization and development of warship construction industry in India. The navy asked the Indian industries to deliver equipment of higher sophistication levels than usual. This led to some unforeseen delays in the product delivery, and struggles perfecting the products.

All the ships of this class are built using DMR 249A special grade high-tensile steel, produced by the state-owned Steel Authority of India Limited (SAIL), and carbon fiber reinforced plastic (CFRP) materials. The main machinery is raft mounted, and each gear unit and its associated engines are mounted on a common raft. The diesel engines are license built by Kirloskar under SEMT Pielstick of France. DCNS supplies the noise-suppressing raft-mounted gearbox for CODAD propulsion. Wärtsilä India manufactures the low-vibration diesel alternators to power the on-board electronics.

The ships also includes an integrated ship management system (ISMS) from L-3 MAPPS which combines an integrated platform management system and bridge management system into a single integrated system.

INS Kiltan and INS Kavaratti are to be more advanced than their elder ships. In a first, composite materials, imported from Kockums, Sweden, are used for the construction of the superstructures. This resulted in increased stealth features, reduced weight relative to typical superstructures built with steel, anti-corrosive and fire resistant. It's also projected for the ships to have some additional armament and new features.

The last ship of the class Kavaratti was commissioned by Indian Army's COAS General Manoj Mukund Naravane on 22 October 2020.

Ships of the class
All the ships names of the class are reincarnations of ships from the previous s which are considered to be the spiritual predecessors of the Kamorta class.

Export

Philippines Navy
In the bidding process, GRSE was selected as the lowest bidder among the contenders, Daewoo Shipbuilding & Marine Engineering, Hyundai Heavy Industries and Navantia. However, based on a post qualification assessment, GRSE was disqualified on the grounds of not meeting the financial capability requirements

Brazilian Navy

In June 2018, GRSE submitted proposal for Brazilian Navy's  future corvette program. GRSE offered a modified Kamorta class of 2,800 tonnes with weapons and sensors on par with its Philippines offer. The project was planned to be completed in Brazil's local shipyard for which GRSE teamed up with Sinergy Group Corporate for local production. GRSE's proposal did not make the downselect in October 2018.

Gallery

See also
 List of active Indian Navy ships
 Future ships of the Indian Navy

References

External links

 
 P-28 Specifications – Global Security
 Kamorta Class Analysis – Defencyclopedia

 
Naval ships of India
Ships built in India